Araucania is a genus of braconid wasps in the  family Braconidae, found in South America. There are at least two described species in Araucania.

The genus Araucania Pate 1947 has been used for a single species of South American wasps in the family Sapygidae. This species was originally described under the genus name Laura (by Reed in 1930) but this name was already in use for a crustacean named in 1883. After Pate described this wasp genus, other authors named genera Araucania only to be forced in turn to replace those names.

In 1993, Marsh used the name Araucania for a genus of two newly described species of South American wasps in the family Braconidae. This genus name has been accepted in recent literature.

Species
These two species belong to the genus Araucania in the family Braconidae:
 Araucania maculipennis Marsh, 1993
 Araucania penai Marsh, 1993

References

Further reading

 

Parasitic wasps
Braconidae
Hymenoptera of South America